Dennis Yuki Mcebo Masina (born 29 May 1982) is a Liswati former footballer who played for clubs in South Africa and Belgium as a midfielder.

Career
Born in Mbabane, Hhohho District, Masina was linked with a move to Feyenoord in July 2002, and later with Tottenham Hotspur in October.

References

External links
 
 

1982 births
Living people
People from Mbabane
Swazi footballers
Eswatini international footballers
Swazi expatriate footballers
Association football midfielders
Manzini Wanderers F.C. players
Bush Bucks F.C. players
SuperSport United F.C. players
S.C. Eendracht Aalst players
K.V. Mechelen players
Orlando Pirates F.C. players
Mpumalanga Black Aces F.C. players
Mbombela United F.C. players
Expatriate footballers in Belgium
Swazi expatriate sportspeople in Belgium
Expatriate soccer players in South Africa
Swazi expatriate sportspeople in South Africa